Hull Kingston Rovers 2015 season is their 134th season in existence, and their 9th competing in the Super League. The Robins made a host of changes to the playing staff for the 2015 season, bringing in 13 new players, and releasing 18.

The 2015 season is Head Coach Chris Chester's first full season in charge, after replacing Craig Sandercock midway through last season. It sees the addition of two new assistant coaches to support the rookie Head Coach, firstly, experienced Assistant Willie Poaching from the Warrington Wolves, and secondly, rookie Assistant Coach David Hodgson, who takes up the duties after retiring from playing at the end of the 2014 season. These new Assistants replace the outgoing Stanley Gene, who moved to permanently take up the position of Head Coach at the Newcastle Thunder at the end of the 2014 season, and the position previously occupied by Chester himself.

2015 also sees the promotion of halfback and U-19's player of the year Matty Marsh to the first team squad.

Transfers

Ins

Outs

2015 Squad
* Announced on 11 December 2014.

Fixtures & Results

Tryscorers

See also
Hull Kingston Rovers
Super League XX

References

Hull Kingston Rovers seasons
Super League XX by club